WCHB (1340 kHz) is a commercial AM radio station licensed to Royal Oak, Michigan, and serving the Detroit metropolitan area. It broadcasts an urban gospel radio format and is owned by Crawford Broadcasting.  The station is a reporter to Billboard's Nielsen/BDS Gospel airplay panel.  The radio studios and offices are shared with co-owned WMUZ, WMUZ-FM and WRDT, on Radio Plaza in Ferndale, Michigan.

WCHB broadcasts in the HD format. It is powered at 1,000 watts, using a directional antenna in the daytime.  The transmitter is on West Woodland Heights Boulevard in Ferndale, near Interstate 75.  Programming is also heard on 99-watt FM translator W244DL at 96.7 MHz in Detroit.

History

WAGM
WCHB was originally known as WAGM.  Some sources claim it went on the air sometime in October 1923.  Others give a debut as August 19, 1926. Local newspapers and national magazines give the date as December 1925.  It is among the oldest stations in the Detroit area.

The original owners of WAGM were a father and son, Alexander G. Miller (a former mayor of Royal Oak), and his oldest son Robert.  The two also operated the A.G. Miller Furniture and Radio Shop. The WAGM call letters were requested.  They stood for the initials of Alexander G. Miller. In its first several years, the station had 50 watts and broadcast three nights a week.

WEXL
WAGM went silent in 1929 due to the death of Alexander Miller.  It was sold to Rev. Jacob B. Spark and Judge George B. Hartrick later that year.  The station returned to the air using the call letters WEXL ("We Excel") in early 1931.  The station carved out a niche with a local, block-programmed schedule, including country music aimed at men who migrated from the Southern United States who went to work in Detroit's automobile assembly plants.

It was at WEXL in 1962 that 16-year-old staff engineer Ed Wolfrum incorporated his newly created passive direct interface box – later known at the "Wolfbox" when he went to "Motown" – as an interface from the high-impedance output of church PA systems to the microphone input of broadcast audio mixers. This "DI unit" later influenced what became known at "The Motown Sound" as a more transparent alternative to recording instrument amplifiers.

In the early 1960s, it tried a Top 40 format with limited success.  So WEXL expanded its country music programming to a full-time format in 1963, the first station in metro Detroit to do so.  The station was successful for a number of years.  A 1966 Billboard magazine poll showed WEXL as the most influential country station in the southeastern Michigan area by far. However, the station got competition in late 1969 when WJBK 1500 (now WLQV) flipped from Top 40 to a Modern Country sound as WDEE.

Christian and Gospel programming
WEXL stayed the course for a time with a mixture of modern and traditional country, but in 1974 the station dropped country music in favor of all-Christian radio programming.  Current owner Crawford Broadcasting acquired WEXL in 1997 and changed the station's format from a combination of Christian preaching and motivational talk to Urban Gospel.

In 2016, WEXL added an FM translator, fed by sister station WMUZ's HD Radio digital subchannel.  It began simulcasting WEXL programming on 96.7 MHz at 99 watts.  The signal is highly directional to the north, to protect the more powerful CHYR-FM in Leamington, Ontario, and WNUC-LP to the east, both of which are also on 96.7 MHz.

On October 1, 2017, WEXL's call sign was changed to WCHB, as Crawford Broadcasting moved the call letters from its newly acquired AM 1200 WMUZ. Ironically, the WCHB calls were first used in 1956 at 1440 on the AM dial, which is now WCHB's competitor station, WMKM.

See also
Media in Detroit

References

External links

CHB
Radio stations established in 1926
Gospel radio stations in the United States